"Oh Girl" is a song written by Eugene Record and recorded by American soul vocal group the Chi-Lites, with Record on vocals and also producing. It was released as a single on Brunswick Records in 1972. Included on the group's 1972 album A Lonely Man, "Oh Girl" centers on a relationship on the verge of break-up. 

"Oh Girl" was the Chi-Lites' first and only No. 1 single on the Billboard Hot 100, peaking at that position in May 1972 for one week. The single also reached the top position of the Billboard R&B Singles chart the following month, remaining in that position for two weeks. Billboard ranked it as the No. 13 song for 1972. In addition, it reached No. 14 on the UK Singles Chart in July 1972, and was a UK hit again in 1975 when reissued as a double A-side with "Have You Seen Her", this time reaching a new peak of No. 5.

The song prominently features a harmonica.

Charts

Weekly charts

Year-end charts

Personnel
Eugene Record - lead vocals, guitar, bass, composer, producer
Robert "Squirrel" Lester - vocals
Creadel "Red" Jones - vocals
Marshall Thompson - vocals, harmonica, melodica
Floyd Morris - piano
Quinton Joseph - drums
Tom Tom (Thomas Washington) - arranger

Paul Young version

The track was most prominently covered in 1990 by Paul Young, from his album Other Voices.  It became a top 10 hit in the U.S. (#8) and Canada (#4).  It was also a major adult contemporary hit, reaching number one on both the US and Canadian Adult Contemporary charts.

Charts

Other covers and uses in the media

 "Oh Boy" was a gender-reversed cover of the song by Renée Geyer released in 1973.
 "Oh Girl" was also covered by British hip hop artist Hard Livin'
Leo Sayer on his 1979 album, Here, and 
Country music singer Con Hunley, who took his version of the song to number 12 on the Billboard Hot Country Singles chart in 1982 with the Oak Ridge Boys on background vocals.
 It was featured as a plot device in the Season Four episode of The Sopranos titled Watching Too Much Television in 2002.
 It was covered in a punk style by Me First and the Gimme Gimmes on their 2003 album, Take a Break.
 Also covered by Smokey Robinson and the Miracles on their album Flying High Together (1972)
 Over thirty years after the original release of "Oh Girl", the recording was sampled by the Southern rapper, Paul Wall, for his 2006 single "Girl".
In 1987, Glenn Jones had a moderate hit on the US Soul singles chart.
 It was also covered by Seal as the last track on his Soul 2 album released in 2011.
 The track was featured in the Spike Lee films Crooklyn (1994) and Chi-Raq (2015).
 British boyband Blue covered "Oh Girl" as an international bonus track for their fifth studio album, Colours (2015).
The Spanish band Los Fugitivos, covered this song on their 2005 album Fue en un Cafe. The song is sung in Spanish except the title of the song being sung in English.

References

External links
 
 

1972 singles
1973 singles
1990 singles
The Chi-Lites songs
Renée Geyer songs
Paul Young songs
Leo Sayer songs
Billboard Hot 100 number-one singles
Cashbox number-one singles
Con Hunley songs
Glenn Jones songs
Songs written by Eugene Record
Song recordings produced by Pete Wingfield
1972 songs
Brunswick Records singles
Columbia Records singles